A Very British Cover-up is a 2009 British short comedy film directed by Ian Smith. It stars Pixie Perez and Gareth David-Lloyd. It was produced in Wales.

Overview
Keen to win the British amateur drag queen final, Rhiannon Grand Slam Glam is caught in the middle of an unfortunate event. Shame about her fellow competitors who appear to have been framed for murder. Is this yet another Royal cover-up scandal? Rhiannon takes it all with a pinch of salt. Never mind at least she has triumphed.

Cast
 Pixie Perez as Rhiannon Grand Slam Glam
 Gareth David-Lloyd as Brian Jones
 Amber Dextrous
 Jolene Dover
 Bella Dix
 Caroline-Jane Bennet
 Colin Charvis

Music

3 tracks by UK Band The Fore called 'We Were Meant To Be', 'Run & Hide', 'That's A Lie' and 'Emma' were featured as part of the soundtrack to the film.

External links
 Film home page
 

2009 films
Films shot in Wales
Welsh films
2009 comedy films
2009 short films
British comedy short films
English-language Welsh films
2000s English-language films
2000s British films